2021–22 UAE Division One is the 45th Division one season. This seasons will expand the league from 11 to 15 teams due to the inclusion of UAE Second Division League teams who were recently promoted into the league.

Team Changes

To Division 1 
Relegated from UAE Pro League
Fujairah 
Hatta

Promoted from UAE Division 2
Abtal Al Khaleej
Dubai City

Joined
Al Rams
Al Jazirah Al Hamra

From Division 1 
Promoted to UAE Pro League
Al Urooba
Emirates

Stadia and locations

Note: Table lists clubs in alphabetical order.

Personnel and kits

Note: Flags indicate national team as has been defined under FIFA eligibility rules. Players may hold more than one non-FIFA nationality.

 Foreign players 
All teams could register as many foreign players as they want, but could only use two on the field each game.

Players name in bold indicates the player is registered during the mid-season transfer window.
Players in italics'' were out of the squad or left the club within the season, after the pre-season transfer window, or in the mid-season transfer window, and at least had one appearance.

Managerial changes

League table

Results

Season statistics

Top Scorers

Number of teams by Emirates

References

UAE
2021–22 in Emirati football